Jessica Dovanne (born February 3, 1986) is a Canadian rugby union player. She represented  at the 2014 Women's Rugby World Cup. In 2013, she was part of the Canadian squad that won the 2013 Nations Cup and the sevens team that took the 2013 Hong Kong Sevens title.

She started playing in highlight (after representing the province as a trampoline and tumbling competitor) and played for the University of Victoria. She then became one of the original centralized national sevens athletes in 2008.

References

1986 births
Living people
Sportspeople from Victoria, British Columbia
Canadian female rugby union players
Canada women's international rugby union players
Female rugby sevens players